Guy Forget and Henri Leconte were the defending champions but lost the final to John McEnroe and Patrick McEnroe, 7–6(7–5), 6–3.

Draw

Final

Group A
Standings are determined by: 1. number of wins; 2. number of matches; 3. in three-players-ties, percentage of sets won, or of games won; 4. steering-committee decision.

Group B
Standings are determined by: 1. number of wins; 2. number of matches; 3. in three-players-ties, percentage of sets won, or of games won; 4. steering-committee decision.

References
Main Draw

Legends Over 45 Doubles